George Morgan Govan (October 30, 1840 - April 14, 1899) was an American military officer and Democratic politician from Mississippi. He was the 27th Secretary of State of Mississippi, serving from 1886 to 1896.

Early life 
George Morgan Govan was born on October 30, 1840, in Marshall County, Mississippi. He was the son of Andrew R. Govan, who was born in Holly Springs, South Carolina and member of the United States House of Representatives. He was a first lieutenant, and later, a major, for the Confederacy in the Civil War. After the war, he returned to Marshall County to farm.

Political career 
He was the clerk of the Mississippi House of Representatives from 1876 to 1878. In 1884, Govan was a member of the Mississippi House of Representatives, representing Pike County. Govan was elected to be the Secretary of State of Mississippi as a Democrat in 1885 for the 1886–1890 term and was inaugurated on January 14, 1886. He was re-elected in 1889 and was re-inaugurated in 1890. The Mississippi Constitutional Convention of 1890 increased his term length from four to six years, making ten years of office in total. Govan was succeeded in the office by John Logan Power on January 20, 1896.

Later life 
In spring 1898, he was commissioned colonel of the First Mississippi Volunteers during the Spanish-American War. He served until later in that same year. He died in a hospital in New Orleans, Louisiana, on April 14, 1899.

Personal life 
Govan married Jane B. Edmondson in Elyton, Alabama, on February 26, 1865. They had three children together: Andrew R., Eliza, and John H.

References 

1840 births
1899 deaths
Secretaries of State of Mississippi
People from Pike County, Mississippi
Democratic Party members of the Mississippi House of Representatives
United States Army colonels
Confederate States Army officers
19th-century American politicians